Kante is a village in Sughd Region, northern Tajikistan. It is part of the jamoat Fondaryo in the Ayni District. It is located near the M34 highway (Tajikistan).

References

Populated places in Sughd Region